Bino A. Realuyo is a Filipino-American novelist, poet, community organizer and adult educator. He was born and raised in Manila, Philippines but spent most of his adult life in New York City. He is the author of a novel, The Umbrella Country, a poetry collection, The Gods We Worship Live Next Door, and the editor of two anthologies.

His acclaimed novel, The Umbrella Country, published in 1999 by Ballantine Reader's Circle, Random House was included in Booklist's Top Ten First Novels of 1999. Upon release, the novel reached the #2 spot in the Philippines. The Umbrella Country was also a nominee for the Barnes & Noble Discover Great Writers Award 1999 and a recipient of the first Asian American "Members' Choice" Literary Award in the year 2000.  According to The New York Times Book Review, "Realuyo’s lucid prose, unencumbered by sentimentality or hindsight, lends freshness to the conflicts of his somewhat familiar characters and color to a setting both impoverished and alluring." The San Francisco Chronicle called Umbrella Country, "a significant contribution to Filipino American literature."  Realuyo's first novel was also highly acclaimed in his home country, the Philippines, and continued to be taught in colleges and universities since its publication in 1999.  The Manila Standard wrote, “This is a dangerous book because it reveals the Filipino soul, tortured, tormented by poverty . . . Everything in this book has the sting of reality. The images are stunning but true. The smells are so strong they assault the reader. The people are familiar characters we have met in the comings and goings, ups and downs of our city lives: They may be stereotypes and archetypes, but you know them all, they were part of each of our past and they’re still very much around, 30 years after Gringo’s recollection.” 

Realuyo's first poetry collection, The Gods We Worship Live Next Door won the 2005 Agha Shahid Ali Prize in Poetry, selected by Grace Schulman, distinguished professor of English at Baruch College, City University of New York and poetry editor of The Nation. It was released by the University of Utah Press in March 2006. The Philippine edition of The Gods We Worship Live Next Door was released by Anvil Press in the Philippines in March 2008, marking his very first book publication in his birth country. The Gods We Worship Live Next Door received a 2009 Philippine National Book Award. In 2019, the Irish band U2 featured his poem Filipineza in its 30th anniversary concert tour of The Joshua Tree in Manila, Philippines.

In Spring 2000, he guest edited  The Literary Review's special issue on contemporary Filipino and Filipino-American literature, Am Here: Contemporary Filipino Writings in English. He is also the editor of The NuyorAsian Anthology: Asian American writings about New York City, a collection commemorating 100 years of Asian American presence in New York City. The anthology was published by the Asian American Writers' Workshop and Temple University Press in 1999, and awarded a PEN Open Book Award 2000. The NuyorAsian Anthology is a collection of fiction, poetry, essays, and art. The anthology maps Asian American life in New York City, beginning with works by poet Jose Garcia Villa in the 1930s and the birth of the Asian-American literary and political movement in the 1970s. The collection also explores the more contemporary voices of Pico Iyer, Bharati Mukherjee, Henry Chang, Xu Xi, Maxine Hong Kingston, Kimiko Hahn, Vijay Seshadri, Betty T. Kao, Wang Ping, and many others. Ranging in age from 16 to 87, more than sixty writers and artists look at love and loss, work and history, identity and sexuality, loneliness and dislocation, giving a closer look at the most diverse ethnic community in the United States.

Realuyo began his writing through his plays and poetry in elementary school in Manila, where he wrote in his native language Pilipino (Tagalog), but later shifted to English when his family immigrated to the United States when he was a teenager. Since co-founding Asian American Writers' Workshop in 1991, he has been publishing in literary journals, magazines and anthologies in the United States including The Nation, Mānoa: A Pacific Journal of International Writing, North American Review,  ZYZZYVA's Resistance Issue, The Literary Review, Mid-American Review, The Missouri Review, New Letters, and The Kenyon Review. The opening poem in The Gods We Worship Live Next Door, Filipineza, originally published in The Nation, is widely anthologized in collections, such as the Norton Anthology Language for a New Century and Fire in the Soul: 100 Poems for Human Rights. The poem's inclusion in U2's The Joshua Tree anniversary concert tour received much media attention and highlighted the plight of Filipino domestics in Asia, the Middle East, and Europe.

Background 

Realuyo is dedicated to social change, inspired by his father, the late Augusto Roa Realuyo, an architect and engineer and survivor of the Bataan Death March and Japanese Concentration Camps in the Philippines during World War II. His poetry manuscript-in-progress The War Theory will include his father's experiences during World War II, from President Franklin D. Roosevelt's recruitment of young Filipinos into the U.S. Army through the terrors of the Bataan Death March and Japanese Camps to the denial of their war-time benefits as a result of the approval by the U.S. Congress of the Rescission Act of 1946.

As a community organizer and adult educator, Realuyo has worked for community and union-related organizations in New York City. For the past thirty years, he has juggled a writing life and a demanding full-time job in adult education. As an educator, he believes in Freirian pedagogical approaches to education—teaching the word by teaching the world. His specialization is the integration of technology and workforce education into ESOL adult literacy classroom. He is the founder of We Speak America, an English Language podcast for adult learners, a project that won a business plan award while he was at Harvard.

He is a world traveler, with deep interest in diverse cultures, history, and languages. His major in college lead him to travel and study in  the U.S. and South America. After receiving his degree and briefly traveling in Europe, he returned to his lifelong passion of creative writing and co-founded The Asian American Writers Workshop in 1991 and dedicated his work life to community organizing and immigrant adult education in New York City's disenfranchised communities. He is multilingual, proficient in Tagalog and Spanish and with limited proficiency in Brazilian Portuguese for having traveled and lived in different cities of Brazil.

Affiliations, Education, and Citations 
Among his numerous literary awards and fellowships are a Van Lier Foundation Fellowship for poetry, the Lucille Medwick Memorial Award from Poetry Society of America, twice recipient (2000 and 2018) of a New York Foundation for the Arts Fellowship for fiction, an Urban Artist Initiative Grant for fiction, a Valparaiso Literary Fellowship for fiction, a Yaddo Fellowship for poetry, Queens Council on the Arts Grant for poetry, and a 2009 Philippine National Book Award for The Gods We Worship Live Next Door.

He has recently completed a new fiction book about the Filipino-American experience in New York City, The F.L.I.P Show (recipient of an Urban Artist Initiative Grant and New York Foundation for the Arts Fellowship in Fiction), a new collection of poems, The Rebel Sonnets, and is currently working on a second novel and another poetry collection, The War Theory (recipient of Queens Council on the Arts Grant and a Yaddo Fellowship).  Poems from his manuscript The Rebel Sonnets have appeared in North American Review,  ZYZZYVA, Painted Bride Quarterly, The Missouri Review, Salamander, and The Common.

Realuyo has a Bachelor of Arts in International Studies from American University School of International Service in Washington, D.C., where he was awarded a Who's Who in American Colleges and Universities, and from Universidad Argentina de la Empresa in Buenos Aires, Argentina. He holds a Master's of Education degree with a focus on Technology and Innovation from Harvard University, where he also served as a Social Entrepreneurship Fellow at John F. Kennedy School of Government's Center for Public Leadership.

References

External links 
 Bino Realuyo home page
 Bold Type Random House
 The Umbrella Country Random House
 The Gods We Worship Live Next Door Univ Utah Press
 Pif Magazine
 New York Press Finding the Face of Asian New York
 Filipinas Cover Story 2000
 The Nation
 Editor, The Literary Review Filipino/Filipino-American Edition 2000
 The Literary Review/WebdelSol Web Chapbook 1998

Living people
Year of birth missing (living people)
American University School of International Service alumni
Harvard Kennedy School alumni
Fairleigh Dickinson University faculty
Filipino writers
Filipino emigrants to the United States
American writers of Filipino descent
Harvard Graduate School of Education alumni